This is a list of Honorary Fellows of Emmanuel College, Cambridge. A list of current honorary fellows is published in the Cambridge University Reporter, Special No. 2, 2015.

 Lawrence Bacow
 Peter Beckwith
 Derek Bok
 John Burland
 Peter Carnley
 Indrajit Coomaraswamy
 Geoffrey Crossick
 Gerald Davies
 David Drewry
 Andrew Fane
 Sebastian Faulks
 Drew Gilpin Faust
 Sir Leslie Fielding
 Sir Roderick Floud
 Michael Frayn
 Conor Gearty
 Jane Ginsburg
 Edith Heard
 Sir Geoffrey Hill
 William Lloyd Hoyt
 Sir Christopher Husbands
 Frank Kelly
 Dame Christina Lambert
 Dennis Lo
 John Lowden
 David Lowen
 Curtis T. McMullen
 John Meggitt
 Sir Eldryd Parry
 Andrew Petter
 Griff Rhys Jones
 Sue Rigby
 Sir Peter Rubin
 Neil L. Rudenstine
 Peter Slee
 Lawrence Summers
 Sir John Taylor
 Moira Wallace

References 

Fellows of Emmanuel College, Cambridge
Emmanuel College, Cambridge
Emmanuel